Diplostomulum is a genus of flatworms belonging to the family Diplostomidae.

The species of this genus are found in Northern America.

Species:
 Diplostomulum bufonis Kaw, 1950 
 Diplostomulum desmognathi Rankin, 1937

References

Platyhelminthes